The Flight Attendants & Related Services Association (FARSA) was a national trade union in New Zealand. It represented New Zealand-based flight attendants at Air New Zealand International including Flight Service Managers. Also represented are flight attendants and cabin managers from Air New Zealand Domestic Jet, Air Nelson, Jetconnect (Qantas) Long Haul & Short Haul, Virgin Australia and Jetstar. It was based in Auckland.

In November 2016, FARSA merged with E Tū, a private sector union.

References

New Zealand Council of Trade Unions
Transport trade unions in New Zealand
Flight attendants' trade unions
Aviation organisations based in New Zealand